Robert Thomas Latshaw Jr. (August 20, 1925 – April 20, 1956) was a United States Air Force flying ace of the Korean War, credited with shooting down five enemy aircraft.

Early life
Latshaw was born on August 20, 1925 in St. Louis.

Military career
He enlisted in the U.S. Army Air Forces on July 7, 1943, and on May 23, he was accepted into the Aviation Cadet Program. On January 27 1945, he was commissioned a second lieutenant and awarded his pilot wings at Boca Raton Army Air Field in Florida. World War II ended before Latshaw could participate in combat missions and he left active duty on December 7, 1946. He returned to active duty in the newly-created U.S. Air Force on October 10, 1947. He was promoted to rank of captain on January 16, 1951.

Korean war

In the late 1951, he was assigned to 335th Fighter Interceptor Squadron of the 4th Fighter Interceptor Wing at Kimpo Air Base in South Korea, during the Korean War. Flying the North American F-86A Sabre, Latshaw shot down his first MiG-15 on January 25, 1952 near Pyongyang. On the same year, the 4th FIW received the F-86E Sabre and Latshaw shot down his second MiG-15 over North Hamgyong on March 19. On April of the same year, he shot down two more MiG-15s. 

On May 3, 1952, Latshaw became the 13th American flying ace of the war, when he shot down his fifth MiG-15 over Yangsi, North Pyongan. He was also credited with damaging four MiG-15s during the war.

Post war
After the war, Latshaw continued to serve in the U.S. Air Force. On April 20, 1956. he was killed in the crash of a Lockheed T-33 Shooting Star near Boca del Rio Air Base in Venezuela. He was buried at the San Francisco National Cemetery.

Awards and decorations

See also
List of Korean War flying aces

References

Sources

1925 births
1956 deaths
American Korean War flying aces
Aviators killed in aviation accidents or incidents
Military personnel from St. Louis
Recipients of the Distinguished Flying Cross (United States)
United States Army Air Forces pilots of World War II
United States Air Force officers
Victims of aviation accidents or incidents in 1956
Victims of aviation accidents or incidents in Venezuela
Burials at San Francisco National Cemetery
Recipients of the Air Medal
Aviators from Missouri